The following is a list of notable deaths in July 1998.

Entries for each day are listed alphabetically by surname. A typical entry lists information in the following sequence:
 Name, age, country of citizenship at birth, subsequent country of citizenship (if applicable), reason for notability, cause of death (if known), and reference.

July 1998

1
Francis Ambrière, 90, French author.
Margarita Azurdia, 67, Guatemalan sculptor, painter, poet, and performance artist.
Jane Bell, 88, Canadian track and field athlete and Olympic champion.
Dumitru Berciu, 91, Romanian historian and archaeologist.
Ed Connolly, 58, American baseball player.
Stig Järrel, 88, Swedish actor, film director and revue artist.
Claire Kelly, 64, American actress and model.
Dimitris Liantinis, 55, Greek philosopher, writer and university professor, suicide.
Martin Seymour-Smith, 70, British poet, literary critic, and biographer.
Rodney Smith, Baron Smith, 84, British surgeon.
Toyonobori, 67, Japanese sumo wrestler, heart failure.

2
Shen Chang-huan, 84, Taiwanese politician and diplomat.
Tony De Vit, 40, English DJ and music producer, bronchial failure.
Joe Graboski, 68, American basketball player.
Miklós Gábor, 79, Hungarian actor.
Valter Külvet, 34, Estonian athlete and Olympian, blunt trauma.
Juan José Nogués, 89, Spanish football player and manager.
Errol Parker, 72, French-Algerian jazz pianist, liver cancer.
Sohrab Shahid-Saless, 54, Iranian film director and screenwriter, liver failure.
Kay Thompson, 88, American author, actress and singer.

3
Arun Kumar Ahuja, 81, Indian film actor and producer.
Danielle Bunten Berry, 49, American game designer and programmer, lung cancer.
Alf Boyd, 77, Scottish football player.
Sadeq Chubak, 81, Iranian author of short fiction, drama, and novels.
Al Couppee, 78, American gridiron football player.
Louis L. Goldstein, 85, American politician.
Billie Hughes, 50, American songwriter, musician and record producer, heart attack.
Bernhard Häring, 85, German Catholic theologian, and priest.
Carl Koch, 86, American architect.
George Lloyd, 85, British composer.
Elizabeth Riddell, 88, Australian poet and journalist.
Lev Rokhlin, 51, Soviet / Russian army officer, murdered.
Kazimierz Sokołowski, 90, Polish ice hockey player.
Duncan White, 80, Sri Lankan track and field athlete and Olympic medalist.

4
Gladys Ambrose, 67, English actress, cancer.
Gregg Burge, 40, American tap dancer and choreographer, brain tumor.
Kurt Franz, 84, German SS officer and commander of the Treblinka extermination camp.
Denis Ségui Kragbé, 60, Ivorian shot putter and discus thrower.
Peter Monteverdi, 64, Swiss carmaker, cancer.
M. N. Sathyaardhi, 85, Indian writer and freedom fighter.
Jay Taylor, 30, American basketball player, burned.

5
Frank Creagh, 74, New Zealand boxer.
Cleeve Horne, 86, Canadian portrait painter and sculptor, respiratory-related illness.
Sid Luckman, 81, American football player (Chicago Bears) and member of the Pro Football Hall of Fame.
Maria Mercè Marçal, 45, Catalan poet, professor, writer and translator from Spain, breast cancer.
Frank Righeimer, 89, American fencer and Olympic medalist.
Johnny Speight, 78, English television scriptwriter, pancreatic cancer.
Stevie Hyper D, 30, British drum and bass MC, heart attack.

6
Semon Knudsen, 85, American automobile executive.
Georges Maton, 84, French cyclist.
Alan Revill, 75, English cricketer.
Roy Rogers, 86, American singer and actor (The Roy Rogers Show), congestive heart failure.
Ed Sanicki, 74, American baseball player.

7
Moshood Kashimawo Olawale Abiola, 60, Nigerian businessman, politician and aristocrat, homicide.
M. Athar Ali, 73, Indian historian, liver cancer.
F. Tillman Durdin, 91, American foreign correspondent for The New York Times.
Lenore Romney, 89, American actress and political figure, stroke.

8
Constance Cox, 85, British script writer and playwright.
Kohei Murakoso, 92, Japanese runner and Olympian, respiratory disease.
Dušan Vukotić, 71, Yugoslav and Croatian cartoonist and author, heart attack.
Lilí Álvarez, 93, Spanish sportswoman, author, feminist and journalist.

9
Knut Bergsland, 84, Norwegian linguist.
Jim Flora, 84, American artist, stomach cancer.
David Fulker, 61, British behavioural geneticist.
Lester King, 59, Jamaican cricket player.
Katherine Russell, 89, English social worker and university teacher.
Halvor J. Sandsdalen, 87, Norwegian farmer, journalist, poet, playwright and children's writer.
Aldo Stellita, 50, Italian bassist and songwriter, lung cancer.

10
Willie Fry, 43, American football player (Pittsburgh Steelers), heart attack.
Billy Patterson, 79, American football player (Chicago Cardinals and Pittsburgh Steelers).
Elijah Pitts, 60, American football player (Green Bay Packers), stomach cancer.
William Preston, 76, American actor.
Victor Smith, 85, Royal Australian Navy officer.

11
Octav Botnar, 84, Romanian-British businessman and founder of Datsun, stomach cancer.
John Boyd-Carpenter, Baron Boyd-Carpenter, 90, British politician.
Komla Agbeli Gbedemah, 85, Ghanaian politician.
Emma Humphreys, 30, British convict, accidental overdose.
Panagiotis Kondylis, 54, Greek philosopher, intellectual and historian.
Guy Lafitte, 71, French jazz saxophonist.
John J. Tominac, 76, United States Army officer and recipient of the Medal of Honor.

12
M. M. S. Ahuja, 69, Indian endocrinologist.
Wilson Francisco Alves, 70, Brazilian football player and manager.
Jimmy Driftwood, 91, American folk music songwriter and musician, heart attack.
Bo Giertz, 92, Swedish theologian, novelist and bishop.
Arkady Ostashev, 72, Russian mechanical engineer.
Maithripala Senanayake, 82, Sri Lankan politician.

13
Watkins Moorman Abbitt, 90, American politician and lawyer, leukemia.
Gauri Ayyub, 67, Indian social worker, activist and writer, acute arthritis.
Red Badgro, 95, American football player, football coach and member of the Pro Football Hall of Fame, fall.
Stanley Bergerman, 94, American producer of horror films, cancer.
John Béchervaise, 88, Australian writer, photographer, artist, historian and explorer.
Konstantinos Kollias, 97, Prime Minister of Greece during the military junta.
Jean René Célestin Parédès, 83, French film actor, heart attack.
Ben Zion Abba Shaul, 73, Israeli Sephardic rabbi.
Sigismund von Braun, 87, German diplomat and politician.

14
Rex Applegate, 84, American army officer.
Beryl Bryden, 78, English jazz singer.
Glenn E. Duncan, 80, United States Air Force officer and World War II flying ace.
Miroslav Holub, 74, Czech poet and immunologist.
Herman David Koppel, 89, Danish composer and pianist.
Richard McDonald, 89, American entrepreneur, co-founder of McDonald's and inventor of the fast food system.
Nguyen Ngoc Loan, 67, South Vietnamese general, cancer.
Robert Augustine Ward Lowndes, 81, American science fiction author and editor.
Karl Schirdewan, 91, German communist activist and East German politician.
Angus John Mackintosh Stewart, 61, British writer.
Thomas Martin Thompson, 43, American convicted murderer, execution by lethal injection.

15
Malcolm Booker, 83, Australian diplomat, author and journalist.
Henry J. Leir, 98, American industrialist, financier, and philanthropist.
Kazimierz Lis, 88, Polish football player.
Joseph Desmond O'Connor, 78, British linguist, pneumonia.
S. Shanmuganathan, 38, Sri Lankan Tamil militant and politician, assassinated.

16
John Ball, 73, English footballer.
Gisella Caccialanza, 83, American prima ballerina, stroke.
John Henrik Clarke, 83, African-American historian and professor, heart attack.
Philip J. Corso, 83, American Army officer, heart attack.
Jess Dobernic, 80, American baseball player.
Mahbub ul Haq, 64, Pakistani economist and politician.
Lucien Lamoureux, 77, Canadian politician and Speaker of the House of Commons of Canada.

17
Lamberto Gardelli, 82, Italian-Swedish conductor.
Gladstone Guest, 81, English football player.
Lillian Hoban, 73, American illustrator and children's writer.
Marc Hunter, 44, New Zealand singer, songwriter and record producer, cancer.
Karl-Heinz Höcker, 82, German theoretical nuclear physicist.
Paul H. Kocher, 91, American academic and writer.
James Lighthill, 74, British mathematician.
Joseph Maher, 64, Irish-American actor, playwright and director, brain tumor, brain cancer.
Hervé Mirouze, 73, French football player and coach.
Hugh Reilly, 82, American actor, emphysema.
Claudia Testoni, 82, Italian hurdler, sprinter and long jumper.

18
Emilio Alfaro, 65, Argentine actor, and theatre and film director.
Florence Bird, 90, Canadian broadcaster, journalist, and senator.
Hans Feibusch, 99, German painter and sculptor.
Mykola Lebed, 89, Ukrainian political activist, nationalist and guerrilla fighter.
Betty Marsden, 79, English comedy actress.
Balangoda Ananda Maitreya Thero, 101, Sri Lankan Buddhist monk.

19
Giliana Berneri, French communist activist.
Antoine Tisné, 65, French composer.
Ralph Toohy, 71, Canadian Football League player.
Elmer Valo, 77, Slovak American baseball player and coach.

20
Norah Borges, 97, Argentine artist.
June Byers, 76, American women's professional wrestler, pneumonia.
Alberto Cavallari, 70, Italian journalist and writer.
Tossy Spivakovsky, 91, Russian-American violin virtuoso.

21
Doug Miller, 28, American gridiron football player, lightning strike.
Alan Shepard, 74, American astronaut, naval aviator and test pilot, complications from leukemia.
Kenneth Watson, 66, British television actor, pancreatic cancer.
Robert Young, 91, American actor (Marcus Welby, M.D., Father Knows Best, Window on Main Street), Emmy winner (1957, 1958, 1970), respiratory failure.

22
Eugene Aserinsky, 77, American sleep researcher, traffic collision.
Fritz Buchloh, 88, German football manager and football player.
Michael Denison, 82, English actor.
Don Dunphy, 90, American television and radio sports announcer.
Judy Malcolm, 87, American film actress.
Corbett Monica, 68, American comedian, cancer.
Hermann Prey, 69, German bass-baritone, heart attack.
Antonio Saura, 67, Spanish artist and writer.
Tjokropranolo, 74, Indonesian politician and military officer.

23
Harvie Branscomb, 103, American theologian and academic.
Vladimir Dudintsev, 79, Russian writer.
André Gertler, 90, Hungarian classical violinist.
Mark Hampton, 58, American designer.
John Hopkins, 67, English film, stage and television writer, domestic accident.
R. Tudur Jones, 77, Welsh nationalist theologian.
Northrup Rand Knox, 69, American banker and community leader.
Djibril Diop Mambéty, 53, Senegalese actor, film director and poet, lung cancer.
Matteo Manuguerra, 73, Tunisian-French baritone.
Med Park, 65, American basketball player.
Muzz Patrick, 83, Canadian ice hockey player and coach.
Wilbur Schwandt, 94, American musician, songwriter.
Manuel Mejía Vallejo, 75 Colombian writer.

24
Gus Alex, 82, Greek-American mobster, heart attack.
Alta Allen, 93, American silent film actress.
Ronnie Grieveson, 88, South African cricketer.
Berta Hrubá, 52, Czech field hockey player and Olympic medalist.
Henri Ziegler, 91, French aerospace engineers, aviation pioneer and first president of Airbus.

25
Les Dodson, 82, American gridiron football player.
David Durand, 77, American actor.
Tal Farlow, 77, American jazz guitarist, esophageal cancer.
Tiny Rowland, 80, British businessman and corporate raider, cancer.

26
Sava Antić, 68, Serbian football player and manager.
Manzoor Alam Beg, 67, Bangladeshi photographer.
Rainey Bennett, 91, American artist, illustrator and muralist.
Seán Ó hEinirí, 83, Irish seanchaí and the last known monolingual Irish speaker.
Zeki Kuneralp, 83, Turkish diplomat, multiple sclerosis.
Aymoré Moreira, 86, Brazilian football player and coach.

27
Binnie Barnes, 95, English actress.
Zlatko Čajkovski, 74, Croatian football player and coach (1948 silver medal, 1952 silver medal).
Russell M. Carneal, 80, American politician and judge.
Elio Augusto Di Carlo, 79, Italian ornithologist, historian and physician.
John Gilliland, 62, American radio broadcaster and documentarian.
Gísli Halldórsson, 71, Icelandic actor.
Elizabeth Karlin, 54, American doctor and advocate for women's reproductive rights, brain tumor.
William McChesney Martin, 91, American businessman and Chair of the Federal Reserve.
Robin Richmond, 86, English cinema organist and BBC Radio presenter.
Farid Shawqi, 77, Egyptian actor, screenwriter and film producer.
Bill Tuttle, 69, American baseball player, cancer.

28
Mykola Bakay, 67, Ukrainian singer, composer, poet and author.
Wilson Teixeira Beraldo, 81, Brazilian physician and physiologist.
Zbigniew Herbert, 73, Polish poet, essayist, drama writer and moralist.
Adam Hollanek, 75, Polish science fiction writer and journalist.
Olga de Blanck Martín, 82, Cuban pianist, guitarist and composer.
Lenny McLean, 49, English boxer, bodyguard and actor, brain cancer, lung cancer.
Consalvo Sanesi, 87, Italian racecar driver.

29
Jorge Pacheco Areco, 78, Uruguayan politician.
Doris Nolan, 82, American actress.
Jerome Robbins, 79, American choreographer, director and dancer (West Side Story), stroke.
Fabrice Simon, 47, Haitian artist and fashion designer, AIDS.
Oothout Zabriskie Whitehead, 87, American actor, cancer.

30
Maurice Bardèche, 90, French art critic and journalist.
Bharathan, 51, Indian film director and artist.
Donald C. Davis, 77, United States Navy admiral, heart attack.
Orestes Marengo, 91, Italian Roman Catholic prelate.
Laila Schou Nilsen, 79, Norwegian sportsperson and Olympic medalist.
Buffalo Bob Smith, 80, American children's television host, cancer.
Kenneth A. Walsh, 81, United States Marine Corps officer, World War II flying ace and Medal of Honor recipient, heart attack.

31
Leroy Edgar Burney, 91, American physician and public health official.
Jean de Baroncelli, 84, French writer.
Erling Evensen, 84, Norwegian cross-country skier and Olympic medalist.
Sylvia Field, 97, American actress.
Arvid Hanssen, 66, Norwegian journalist, newspaper editor, poet, novelist and children's writer.
Ioan Ploscaru, 86, Romanian bishop of the Greek-Catholic Church.
John E. Powers, 87, American politician.
Richie Powers, 67, American basketball referee, stroke.
Herbert Widmayer, 84, German football player and manager.

References 

1998-07
07